Matthew Cross can refer to:

 Matthew Cross (cricketer) (born 1992), Scottish cricketer
 Matthew Cross (rugby league) (born 1981), Australian rugby league player
 Matt Cross (wrestler) (born 1980), American wrestler